Toby Froud (born 1984) is an English-American artist, special effects designer, puppeteer, filmmaker, and performer. He rose to prominence for his role as the baby who was wished away to the goblins in the 1986 Jim Henson film Labyrinth. He became a puppeteer, sculptor, and fabricator for film, television, and theatre. He wrote and directed the 2014 fantasy short film Lessons Learned. He was the design supervisor of the 2019 streaming television series The Dark Crystal: Age of Resistance.

Early life 
Toby Froud was born in 1984 in London, to English painter Brian Froud and American puppet-maker Wendy Froud. His maternal grandfather was the German-American sculptor Walter Midener (1912–1998), and his maternal grandmother was Margaret "Peggy" Midener (née Mackenzie; 1925–2016), a painter and collage artist in Michigan.

His parents met in 1978 while working on preproduction for the 1982 Jim Henson film The Dark Crystal, for which Brian was the conceptual designer and Wendy a puppet fabricator. They married in 1980. Froud was born during preproduction of his parents' second film with Henson, Labyrinth (released in 1986), and at the age of one he was featured in the film as the baby who is wished away to the Goblin King by his older sister Sarah. The name of the baby in the script had originally been Freddie, but was changed to Toby so as not to confuse Froud. Due to Labyrinths popularity Froud has garnered a cult status and been described as one of the most famous babies in cinema and of the 1980s.

Froud was raised in Chagford, Devon, on the edge of Dartmoor. He developed an interest in puppetry from a young age due to exposure to his parents' artwork.

Career 
Froud apprenticed at the Muppet Workshop in New York in 1999, and in 2004 worked at Weta Workshop in New Zealand as a sculptor, fabricator, and miniature effects artist for the 2005 films The Chronicles of Narnia: The Lion, the Witch and the Wardrobe and King Kong. He graduated from Wimbledon School of Art in 2006 with a BA in technical arts and special effects.

In 2007 he built props and sets for the British children's television show What's Your News?, and created masks and puppets for the London theatre productions of Beauty and the Beast and Cinderella. Michael Curry Design Inc. in Portland, Oregon hired Froud in 2009 as a puppet fabricator and video artist on several productions, including Michael Jackson: The Immortal World Tour.

In 2010 Froud worked for Legacy Effects in San Fernando, California as a fabricator on the film Cowboys & Aliens. Since 2010, Froud has worked for the stop-motion animation studio Laika in Portland, sculpting and fabricating puppets for the studio's films ParaNorman (2012), The Boxtrolls (2014), Kubo and the Two Strings (2016) and Missing Link (2019).

Froud established the production company Stripey Pajama Productions, named for the outfit he wore as the baby in Labyrinth. He wrote and directed the 2014 fantasy short film Lessons Learned, produced by Heather Henson's company IBEX Puppetry for its Handmade Puppet Dreams series.

He served as a creature designer on the 2016 film I Am Not a Serial Killer, and alongside Heather Henson was executive producer of the 2017 film Yamasong: March of the Hollows.

Froud spent two years serving as design supervisor on the 2019 streaming television series The Dark Crystal: Age of Resistance, a prequel to The Dark Crystal, and in 2019 he began work as a puppet sculptor on the Guillermo del Toro film Pinocchio.

Performing arts 
Froud's performance skills include stiltwalking and fire juggling. He performed in various productions with William Todd-Jones and music group Daughters of Elvin. He puppeteered as the opening act for Scissor Sisters at the 2005 Brit Awards, and has performed at Faerieworlds. As of 2007 and 2011, Froud was working as a stilt-walker and dancing bear with a troupe touring throughout England.

Personal life 
Froud is married and has a son, Sebastian. He resides in Portland, Oregon.

Filmography

Film

Television

Awards

References

External links 

 

Living people
1984 births
Alumni of Wimbledon College of Arts
Film male child actors
English male child actors
English puppeteers
English filmmakers
British production designers
Stop motion animators
Special effects people
Miniature model-makers
Visual effects artists
American male child actors
American puppeteers
American filmmakers
American production designers